The 2014 W-League grand final took place at nib Stadium in Perth, Western Australia on 21 December 2014.

Match details

References

Grand final
A-League Women Grand Finals
Soccer in Perth, Western Australia